Deeragun is an outer western town and suburb of Townsville in the City of Townsville, Queensland, Australia.

Geography 
Deeragun is mainly a residential and rural-residential suburb characterised by the hill at Innes Estate and the Saunders Creek nature strip.

Deeragun is bounded to the north by the Bruce Highway and North Coast railway line, by Veale Street to the north-west and Saunders Creek to the south-west.

History
Deeragun is a relatively new suburb, being developed in the 1990s.  The suburb is laid out around the old school and Nightjar Railway Station with much of the original residential development built by the Housing Commission.  The origin of the name Deeragun is unrecorded.

St Anthony's Catholic School opened inn 1992.

St Anthony's Catholic College (secondary campus) opened on 24 January 2005.

As at  the population of Deeragun was 3,525 people.

Northern Beaches State High School opened on 28 January 1997.

Facilities
The suburb contains the Woodlands Centro shopping complex that provides Northern Beaches residents access to a supermarket, a post office, several fast food outlets, medical and veterinary services, some recreational businesses and fuel service stations.  Additional shopping and restaurant amenities are in various stages of construction since 2011.

A police station, Community Recreation Hall, a few churches and Woodlands Skate Park are also located in Deeragun.

The Townsville City Council operate a mobile library service which visits the North Townsville Community Hub at Deeragun on Monday mornings.

Transport

Arterial road
The Bruce Highway borders Deeragun to the north.  It is at Deeragun where the Bruce Highway becomes a dual lane carriageway for the first time when approaching Townsville from the north.  The Townsville Ring Road is a high-speed bypass road for traffic between Deeragun and Bohle Plains suburbs.

Public transport
Hermit Park Bus Service connects Deeragun with Townsville by providing through its "Route 33" a direct bus route to the Aitkenvale and Townsville CBD bus exchanges.  Route 33 is part of the Department of Transport and Main Roads qconnect initiative and also has a major stop in Bushland Beach.

The taxi service as an alternative form of public transport is also available in Deeragun.  This service is operated by Townsville Taxis.

Airport

Education
St Anthony's Catholic College is a Catholic primary (Prep-6) and secondary (7-12) school at the corner Veales Road and Joanne Street for boys and girls at Veales Road. In 2017, the school had an enrolment of 1,236 students with 92 teachers (89 full-time equivalent) and 76 non-teaching staff (51 full-time equivalent).

Northern Beaches State High School is a government secondary (7-12) school for boys and girls at Meranti Street. In 2017, the school had an enrolment of 760 students with 69 teachers (67 full-time equivalent) and 43 non-teaching staff (28 full-time equivalent). It includes a special education program.

There is no government primary school in the suburb; the nearest is Bohlevale State School just across the Bruce Highway in Burdell.

Additionally, there is a number of child care facilities available in the suburb.

References

External links 

 
 

Suburbs of Townsville
Towns in Queensland